The 2016 Northern Illinois Huskies football team represented Northern Illinois University as a member of the West Division of the Mid-American Conference (MAC) during the 2016 NCAA Division I FBS football season. Led by fourth-year head coach Rod Carey, the Huskies compiled an overall record of 5–7 with a mark of 5–3 in conference play, placing third in the MAC's West Division. The team played home games at Huskie Stadium in DeKalb, Illinois.

Previous season
The Huskies finished the 2015 season 8–6, 6–2 in MAC play to finish in a four-way tie for the West Division title. They represented the West Division in the MAC Championship Game where they lost to Bowling Green. They were invited to the Poinsettia Bowl where they lost to Boise State.

Preseason
For the second straight year, the Huskies were picked to finish third in the division in 2016 in the poll released during the 2016 MAC Media Day at Ford Field in Detroit.

Schedule

Game summaries

Wyoming

The Cowboys beat the Huskies in triple overtime, 40–34.  NIU quarterback Drew Hare went 24-for-39 for 327 yards, with three touchdowns and no interceptions.  Receiver Kenny Golladay gained 144 yards on 10 catches with one touchdown and got 82 yards and another touchdown rushing.  However, the Huskies had 12 penalties for 108 yards.  The game was scheduled to start at 8:30 p.m. Mountain Time, but began almost two hours late due to lightning.  The game ended at 2:35 a.m. MT, which was 3:35 a.m. for NIU fans back in Illinois.

South Florida

San Diego State

Western Illinois

Ball State

Western Michigan

Central Michigan

Buffalo

Bowling Green

Toledo

The Huskies lost to the Rockets 31–24.  The loss eliminated Northern Illinois from bowl game eligibility, ending their conference-record streak of eight straight bowl games.  NIU had beaten Toledo in their six previous matchups.  This was the first football game ever played at Guaranteed Rate Field, the recently-renamed stadium of the Chicago White Sox.

Eastern Michigan

Kent State

Postseason awards

All-MAC

References

Northern Illinois
Northern Illinois Huskies football seasons
Northern Illinois Huskies football